Rodrigo Nicolás Moya Garrido (born 25 May 1994) is a Chilean footballer who last played  for Deportes Recoleta as a defender.

Career
He debuted on 1 February 2013 in a match against Audax Italiano for the 2013 Torneo Transición.

References

External links

Rodrigo Moya at playmakerstats.com (English version of ceroacero.es)

Living people
1994 births
People from Santiago
People from Santiago Province, Chile
People from Santiago Metropolitan Region
Footballers from Santiago
Chilean footballers
Universidad de Chile footballers
A.C. Barnechea footballers
Magallanes footballers
Deportes Magallanes footballers
Deportes Melipilla footballers
Coquimbo Unido footballers
Deportes Colchagua footballers
Deportes Recoleta footballers
Chilean Primera División players
Primera B de Chile players
Segunda División Profesional de Chile players
Association football defenders